Jan Jacek Bruski (born 1969) is a Polish historian. His specialization is a history of 20th Century.

In 1999 he gained his PhD (thesis: Centrum Państwowe Ukraińskiej Republiki Ludowej na wychodźstwie w latach 1919-1924. Monografia polityczna; supervisor: Michał Pułaski). In 2011 he passed his habilitation (thesis: Między prometeizmem a Realpolitik. II Rzeczpospolita wobec Ukrainy Sowieckiej, 1921-1926).

Bruski is working at the Jagiellonian University.

For his book Między prometeizmem a Realpolitik. II Rzeczpospolita wobec Ukrainy Sowieckiej 1921-1926 Bruski won the Henryk Wereszycki and Wacław Felczak Award.

Books 
Petlurowcy. Centrum Państwowe Ukraińskiej Republiki Ludowej na wychodźstwie, 1919-1924, 1st ed. Kraków 2000, 2nd ed. Kraków 2004.
Ukraina, 2nd ed., Warszawa 200, (with Andrzej Chojnowski).
Miedzy prometeizmem a Realpolitik. II Rzeczpospolita wobec Ukrainy Sowieckiej 1921-1926, Kraków 2010.

Footnotes

External links 
Jan Jacek Bruski on a website of the Jagiellonian University

21st-century Polish historians
Polish male non-fiction writers
1969 births
Living people